Margaret Hayes (born  Florette Regina Ottenheimer; December 5, 1916 – January 26, 1977) was an American film, stage, and television actress.

Early years
Hayes was born in Baltimore, Maryland (some sources say Pottsville, Pennsylvania) into a Jewish family.

Her father was Jack Lewis Ottenheimer, a "musician, theatrical man, and joke-book writer." (Some sources say that he was a real estate broker.).

While a student at Forest Park High School, she joined the Emerson Cook Stock Company to gain more acting experience. She entered Johns Hopkins University to become a nurse, but stuck to her dramatic ambitions. At the school, she joined "The Barnstormers", a theatrical organization, becoming the first female member of that group.

Changing names
Using the name "Dana Dale", Hayes found work as a model, "featured in the best cigarette, auto, and fashion advertisements". Her screen test for the role of Scarlett O'Hara in Gone with the Wind was unsuccessful, but she received a movie contract, anyway. Publicists at her studio recommended "Dana Edwards" as a better name for movies, so she began using it. Eventually, she changed to Margaret Hayes for public purposes, and was called Maggie by her friends.

Film
Hayes' initial contract was with Warner Bros. Having little success there, she signed with Paramount Pictures.

Hayes was often billed as Maggie Hayes in her film credits. She is perhaps best known for her role as Lois Judby Hammond in the 1955 film Blackboard Jungle, which starred Glenn Ford. In 1956, she guest-starred as Dora Hand in three episodes of The Life and Legend of Wyatt Earp. She appeared in the episode "The San Saba Incident" (October 18, 1957) of Trackdown, playing a female convict, named Abby Lindon.

Hayes' films included The Glass Key, Sullivan's Travels, and Good Day for a Hanging. In 1958, in the film Damn Citizen, Hayes appeared opposite Keith Andes in the role of a real person, Dorothy Maguire Grevemberg, the wife of the crusading Louisiana State Police superintendent Francis Grevemberg. She made four guest appearances on CBS's Perry Mason, including as defendant Sybil Granger in 1957 episode "The Case of the Nervous Accomplice". She co-starred on Tombstone Territory season 1 episode 24 'Cave-In' which aired March 26, 1958. In 1961, she portrayed  Mrs. North in the episode "Incident of the Night on the Town" on CBS"s Rawhide. In the same year, she also guest-starred in an episode of Bonanza, "The Countess", as Lady Linda Chadwick.

Journalism
After marrying Herbert Bayard Swope in 1946, Hayes temporarily retired from acting and turned to journalism, eventually becoming assistant fashion editor for Life.

Radio
In her later years, Hayes lived in Palm Beach, Florida, and was the host of a daily radio talk show on WPBR.

Personal life
Hayes had her first child, a daughter Nan (born 1937), from her brief first marriage to Charles DeBuskey. The couple divorced in 1939, and Hayes subsequently married actor Leif Erickson on June 12, 1942, eloping with him to Minden, Nevada. They separated 28 days later, and Hayes received a divorce on October 2, 1942.

She married a third time, to producer Herbert B. Swope, Jr. (son of three-time winner of the Pulitzer Prize for Reporting, journalist Herbert Swope), in 1947. The couple had a daughter, actress Tracy Brooks Swope, and a son, Herbert Swope III. Swope and she divorced in 1973.

Death
Hayes died January 26, 1977, aged 60, in Mount Sinai Medical Center in Miami Beach, Florida.

Partial filmography

The Man Who Talked Too Much (1940) - Governor's Secretary
Ladies Must Live (1940) - Chorus Girl 
Money and the Woman (1940) - Depositor (uncredited)
City for Conquest (1940) - Sally - Irene's Friend (uncredited)
Tugboat Annie Sails Again (1940) - Rosie
In Old Colorado (1941) - Myra Woods
Henry Aldrich for President (1941) - Miss Patterson (uncredited)
New York Town (1941) - Lola Martin (uncredited)
Skylark (1941) - Blake's Receptionist (uncredited)
The Night of January 16th (1941) - Nancy Wakefield
Sullivan's Travels (1941) - Secretary
Louisiana Purchase (1941) - Louisiana Belle
The Lady Has Plans (1942) - Rita Lenox
Saboteur (1942) - Henry's Wife in Movie (uncredited)
Take a Letter, Darling (1942) - Sally French
The Glass Key (1942) - Eloise Matthews
Scattergood Survives a Murder (1943) - Gail Barclay
 Stand By All Networks (1942) - Lela Cramer
One Dangerous Night (1943) - Patricia Blake Shannon
They Got Me Covered (1943) - Lucille
Blackboard Jungle (1955) - Lois Judby Hammond
Violent Saturday (1955) - Mrs. Emily Fairchild
The Bottom of the Bottle (1956) - Lil Breckinridge
From the Desk of Margaret Tyding (1956)
Omar Khayyam (1957) - Queen Zarada
Damn Citizen (1958) - Dorothy Grevemberg
The Case Against Brooklyn (1958) - Lil Polombo née Alexander
Girl in the Woods (1958) - Bell Cory
Fräulein (1958) - Lt. Berdie Dubbin
Good Day for a Hanging (1959) - Ruth Granger
The Beat Generation (1959) - Joyce Greenfield
Girls Town (1959) - Mother Veronica
13 West Street (1962) - Mrs. Madeleine Landry
House of Women (1962) - Zoe Stoughton

References

External links
 
 
 

1916 births
1977 deaths
American film actresses
American stage actresses
American television actresses
Deaths from hepatitis
Jewish American actresses
Deaths from liver cancer
Actresses from Baltimore
Deaths from cancer in Florida
20th-century American actresses
Paramount Pictures contract players